Quípama is a town and municipality in the Colombian Department of Boyacá, part of the subregion of the Western Boyacá Province.

Climate
Quípama has a tropical rainforest climate (Af) with heavy to very heavy rainfall year-round.

It is home of one of the largest emerald mines in the world.

See also 

 Las Pavas
 Muzo, Chivor, Somondoco

References

External links 

Municipalities of Boyacá Department